Isidro González (born 15 October 1907, date of death unknown) was a Spanish fencer. He competed in the individual sabre event at the 1928 Summer Olympics. He went 1-3 in the Sabre, Individual Men's event with his only win against Henri Brasseur of Belgium.

References

External links
 

1907 births
Year of death missing
Spanish male sabre fencers
Olympic fencers of Spain
Fencers at the 1928 Summer Olympics